The FILA 1997–98 Professional Basketball season was the second season of the Korean Basketball League.

Regular season

Playoffs

Prize money
Daejeon Hyundai Dynat: KRW 150,000,000 (champions + regular-season 1st place)
Busan Kia Enterprise: KRW 70,000,000 (Runners-up + regular-season 3rd place)
Gyeongnam LG Sakers: KRW 30,000,000 (regular-season 2nd place)

External links
Official KBL website (Korean & English)

1997–98
1997–98 in South Korean basketball
1997–98 in Asian basketball leagues